South San Antonio High School is a public high school located in the city of San Antonio, Texas, United States and classified as a 6A school by the UIL. It is a part of the South San Antonio Independent School District located in southwest Bexar County.  South San Antonio High School opened in a new building on August 26, 2013. In 2015, the school was rated "Met Standard" by the Texas Education Agency.

Athletics
The South San Antonio Bobcats compete in these sports 

Baseball
Basketball
Cross Country
Football
Golf
Powerlifting
Softball
Swimming
Tennis
Track and Field
Volleyball

State Titles
Baseball 
1958(3A), 1959(3A), 1961(3A), 1963(3A), 1964(3A), 1966(3A), 1967(3A),
Boys Basketball 
1961(3A)

References

External links

South San Antonio ISD

High schools in San Antonio
Public high schools in Bexar County, Texas
2013 establishments in Texas